Kenneth James William Mackay, 3rd Earl of Inchcape (27 December 1917 – 17 March 1994), was a businessman and an earl in the Peerage of the United Kingdom. He became Earl of Inchcape on 21 June 1939 after the death of his father, Kenneth Mackay, 2nd Earl of Inchcape. During the Second World War, he gained the rank of Lieutenant with the 12th Royal Lancers and Major with the 27th Lancers.

Education
Inchcape attended Eton, and Trinity College, Cambridge.

Appointments
Director (1957-1983), Chairman (1973-1983), and Chief Executive (1978-1981) of P&O
Chairman and Chief Executive of Inchcape & Company Limited (1958-1982)
Chairman of the Committee for Middle East Trade [COMET] (1963-1965)
President of the Royal Society for India, Pakistan and Ceylon (1970-1976)
President of the General Council of British Shipping (1976-1977)
Director of Burmah Oil
Director of Standard and Chartered Banking Group Limited
Director of The Chartered Bank
Director of British Petroleum
Director of Guardian Royal Exchange

Family
Inchcape was the son of Kenneth Mackay, 2nd Earl of Inchcape, and his first wife Joan Moriarty, daughter of John Francis Moriarty, Lord Justice of the Irish Court of Appeal. His half-brother on his father's side was the life peer Simon Mackay, Baron Tanlaw.

Between 12 February 1941 and their divorce in 1954, Lord Inchcape was married to Aline Thorn Pease, widow of an R.A.F. officer, and daughter of Sir Richard Pease, 2nd Baronet and Jeanette Thorn Kissel. They had three children – 
 Lucinda Louise Mackay, born 13 December 1941
Peter Mackay, 4th Earl of Inchcape, born 23 January 1943
James Jonathan Thorn Mackay, born 28 May 1947.

On 3 February 1965 he married Caroline Harrison, daughter of Cholmeley Dering Cholmeley-Harrison and Barbara Mary Corisande Bellew, with whom he had three sons (two by birth and one by adoption)
 Anthony Mackay (b.1967)
 Shane Mackay (b.1973) 
 Ivan Mackay (b.1976), owner of the Brux estate, Aberdeenshire.

In 1969, Countess Inchcape became Lloyd's of London's first female Name.

References

3rd Earl of Inchcape at thepeerage.com
Inchcape, Earl of (UK, 1929) at cracroftspeerage.co.uk
Burke's Peerage, Baronetage & Knightage (107th edition, 2003) volume 2, page 2031
Obituary The Independent
Obituary NYT

External links

http://www.jta.org/1964/07/31/archive/british-trade-council-for-middle-east-says-it-accedes-to-arab-boycott
Britain and the Middle East: Economic History, 1945-87 p187 by Frank Brenchley
The Comet Trade Mission to Syria and Iran by Sir Edwin Chapman Andrews

1917 births
People educated at Eton College
Alumni of Trinity College, Cambridge
Earls in the Peerage of the United Kingdom
BP people
1994 deaths
27th Lancers officers